Thierry Bourguignon (born 19 December 1962 in La Mure) is a French former road cyclist.

Major results

1988
 1st Tour Nivernais Morvan
1990
 1st Stage 2 Tour du Vaucluse
 2nd Overall Tour du Vaucluse
 3rd Cholet-Pays de Loire
1993
 1st Overall Tour du Vaucluse
 4th Overall Route du Sud
1995
 1st Stage 2b Grand Prix du Midi Libre
 3rd Cholet-Pays de Loire
1998
 8th Overall Critérium du Dauphiné Libéré

Grand Tour results

Tour de France
1991: 25th
1992: 29th
1993: 36th
1996: 62nd
1997: 28th
1998: 26th
1999: 48th

Vuelta a España
1990: 37th

Giro d'Italia
1993: 25th
1994: DNF

References

1962 births
Living people
French male cyclists
People from La Mure
Sportspeople from Isère
Cyclists from Auvergne-Rhône-Alpes